Ivide Ee Theerathu is a 1985 Indian Malayalam film, directed by P. G. Vishwambharan and produced by Augustine Prakash. The film stars Rahman, Madhu, Srividya, Rohini and K. P. Ummer in the lead roles. The film has musical score by A. T. Ummer.

Cast
Rahman as Gopinath
Madhu as Prof. P. N. Thampi
Srividya as Madhaviyamma
Rohini as Sreedevi
K. P. Ummer as Keshava Kaimal
Jose Prakash as Principal Father
Santhosh as Raju
James as Thomas
Sasikumar as Sasi
Beena Sabu as Annamma
Innocent as Adv. Lonappan
Ahalya as Shantha
KPAC Sunny as Barrister Das

Soundtrack
The music was composed by A. T. Ummer and the lyrics were written by Bichu Thirumala.

References

External links
 

1985 films
1980s Malayalam-language films
Films directed by P. G. Viswambharan